Boʻka District is a district of Tashkent Region in Uzbekistan. The capital lies at the city Boʻka. The district consists of one city (Boʻka) and 8 rural communities (Iftixor, Qoraqoʻyli, Turon, Koʻkorol, Qoʻshtepa, Namuna, Rovot, Chigʻatoy).

References

Districts of Uzbekistan
Tashkent Region